Scottie Jordan Wilbekin (born April 5, 1993) is an American-born naturalized Turkish professional basketball player for Fenerbahçe Beko of the Turkish Basketbol Süper Ligi (BSL) and the EuroLeague. He played college basketball for the Florida Gators, where he was named the Southeastern Conference Player of the Year in 2014. Wilbekin played professional basketball in Australia, Greece, Turkey and Israel. He led Darüşşafaka to win the 2018 EuroCup title, while earning the EuroCup Finals and the Regular Season MVP awards.

College career
After skipping his senior year at The Rock, Wilbekin accepted an athletic scholarship to attend the University of Florida in Gainesville, Florida, where he played for coach Billy Donovan's Gators teams from 2010 to 2014. During his 2013–14 senior season, he led the Florida Gators to the Southeastern Conference (SEC) regular season championship and the SEC Tournament title, and he was named the SEC Player of the Year by the conference's coaches and the Associated Press. In addition, The Sporting News named him a third-team All-American. With Wilbekin as the team's senior leader, the Gators advanced to the 2014 NCAA Final Four.

Professional career

Cairns Taipans (2014–2015)
After going undrafted in the 2014 NBA draft, Wilbekin joined the Memphis Grizzlies for the Orlando Summer League and the Philadelphia 76ers for the Las Vegas Summer League. On August 22, 2014, he signed with the Cairns Taipans for the 2014–15 NBL season. On October 14, 2014, he was named Player of the Week for Round 1 after scoring 23 points against Adelaide on October 10 and 27 points against Melbourne on October 12. On November 6, 2014, he was named Player of the Month for October after guiding the Taipans to a 6–0 unbeaten start to the season.

On February 16, 2015, at the Taipans' annual awards night, Wilbekin was named the club Defensive Player of the Year and Most Valuable Player. He and the Taipans went on to defeat the New Zealand Breakers in the final game of the regular season on February 22 to finish on top of the ladder for the first time in club history with a win–loss record of 21–7. He was subsequently named Player of the Week for Round 20 after scoring 18 of his 25 points in the second half of the Taipans' 81–77 win over the Breakers which helped them secure the club's first ever minor premiership. After sweeping the Perth Wildcats in the semi-finals, the Taipans faced the Breakers in the Grand Final series, going on to lose the series 2–0 following a game-winning shot by Ekene Ibekwe in Game 2. Wilbekin appeared in all 32 games for the Taipans and averaged 15.2 points, 3.7 rebounds, 4.3 assists and 1.1 steals per game.

AEK (2015)
On March 12, 2015, Wilbekin signed with the Greek Basket League club AEK, for the rest of the 2014–15 Greek Basket League season. In nine games with AEK, he averaged 8.0 points, 2.3 rebounds and 3.9 assists per game.

Philadelphia 76ers (2015)
On June 30, 2015, Wilbekin joined the Orlando Magic white team for the Orlando Summer League. On July 3, 2015, he re-signed with the Taipans for the 2015–16 NBL season. Later that month however, after a stint with the Philadelphia 76ers at the Las Vegas Summer League, Wilbekin opted out of his deal with the Taipans in order to sign in the NBA. On July 24, 2015, he signed a four-year deal with the 76ers. However, he was later waived by the team on October 26 after appearing in five preseason games.

Darüşşafaka (2015–2018)
On October 31, 2015, he signed with Darüşşafaka Doğuş of Turkey for the 2015–16 season, with the option to extend for one season.

On March 28, 2017, Wilbekin signed a two-year contract extension with Darüşşafaka. In his second season with Daçka, Wilbekin helped the team to reach the 2017 EuroLeague Playoffs as the eighth seed, but they eventually were eliminated by Real Madrid in the Quarterfinals.

On January 1, 2018, Wilbekin was named EuroCup Regular Season MVP. On March 23, 2018, Wilbekin recorded a career-high 41 points by shooting 10-for-15 from three-point range – which is a EuroCup all-time records in both categories for a non-overtime game, and led Darüşşafaka to the 2018 EuroCup Finals after an 87–83 win over Bayern Munich. On April 6, 2018, Wilbekin was named Eurocup MVP and earned a spot in the All-EuroCup First Team. On April 13, 2018, Wilbekin led Darüşşafaka to win the 2018 EuroCup Championship after beating Lokomotiv Kuban in the Finals, where he averaged 26 points per game. He was subsequently named the EuroCup Finals MVP.

Maccabi Tel Aviv (2018–2022)
On July 10, 2018, Wilbekin signed a two-year deal with Israeli team Maccabi Tel Aviv of the EuroLeague. On October 18, 2018, Wilbekin scored a EuroLeague career-high 28 points, shooting 10-of-16 from the field, along with five assists and four rebounds in a 78–68 win over Budućnost. Two days later, Wilbekin was named EuroLeague Round 3 co-MVP, alongside Rodrigue Beaubois. On January 20, 2019, Wilbekin recorded a season-high 36 points, shooting 7-of-15 from 3-point range, along with four assists and three steals in a 94–104 overtime loss to Hapoel Tel Aviv. In the fourth quarter of that game, Wilbekin scored an Israeli League-record 25 points for a single quarter. On February 7, 2019, Wilbekin recorded 17 points, including a game-winner shot with 4.4 seconds left in a 65–64 win over Olympiacos.

On October 27, 2019, Wilbekin recorded 26 points, while shooting 6-of-7 from three-point range, including 13 points in 70 seconds during the third quarter, as he led Maccabi to an 89–73 win over Hapoel Jerusalem. Two days later, He was named Israeli League Round 4 MVP. On December 23, 2019, Wilbekin recorded a season-high 35 points, along with nine assists and five rebounds in a 112–110 double overtime win over Hapoel Gilboa Galil.

On January 29, 2020, Wilbekin signed a three-year contract extension with Maccabi.

Fenerbahçe Beko (2022–present) 
On June 26, 2022, Wilbekin signed a three-year contract with Fenerbahçe Beko of the Turkish Basketbol Süper Ligi.

Turkey national team
On June 18, 2018, Wilbekin got a Turkish passport. He was subsequently named a member of the senior Turkish national basketball team, for the 2019 FIBA Basketball World Cup qualification games. He made his debut with Turkey on June 28, 2018, scoring 13 points in a win over Ukraine. In 2019, Wilbekin was a member of the senior men's Turkish national basketball team for the 2019 FIBA Basketball World Cup. He played four games in the tournament, averaging 10.3 points, 6.5 assists and 2.8 rebounds, leading Turkey in assists per game. His outings including a 9 point, 13 assist game against Montenegro in the teams 77–74 classification round win. Turkey finished the tournament 22nd overall, after first round losses to United States and Czech Republic stopped them from progressing.

Personal life
Wilbekin's younger brother, Mitchell, played college basketball for Wake Forest University from 2014–2018; appearing in 119 games, starting 89, over his four-year career. Scottie's other younger brother, Andrew, is currently attending Husson University in Maine.

Career statistics

EuroLeague

|-
| style="text-align:left;"| 2015–16
| style="text-align:left;" rowspan=2| Darüşşafaka
| 20 || 5 || 21.3 || .377 || .350 || .756 || 1.5 || 2.3 || 1.0 || .1 || 10.3 || 7.8
|-
| style="text-align:left;"| 2016–17
| 31 || 17 || 25.1 || .429 || .404 || .870 || 1.8 || 3.2 || 1.4 || .0 || 11.6 || 11.1
|-
| style="text-align:left;"| 2018–19
| style="text-align:left;"rowspan=2| Maccabi
| 29 || 29 || 24.3 || .397 || .328 || .800 || 1.8 || 3.1 || .9 || .0 || 12.9 || 11.0
|-
| style="text-align:left;"| 2019–20
| 26 || 25 || 26.1 || .436 || .435 || .813 || 2.0 || 3.4 || 1.2 || .0 || 16.1 || 15.8
|-
|- class="sortbottom"
| style="text-align:center;" colspan=2| Career
| 106 || 76 || 24.4 || .413 || .383 || .815 || 1.8 || 3.1 || 1.2 || .0 || 12.8 || 11.3

EuroCup

|-
| style="text-align:left;background:#AFE6BA;"| 2017–18
| style="text-align:left;" rowspan=1| Darüşşafaka
| 18 || 18 || 31.8 || .451 || .428 || .829 || 2.4 || 4.8 || 1.6 || 0 || style="background:#CFECEC;"|19.7 || style="background:#CFECEC;"|21.3
|-
|- class="sortbottom"
| style="text-align:center;" colspan=2| Career
| 18 || 18 || 31.8 || .451 || .428 || .829 || 2.4 || 4.8 || 1.6 || 0 || 19.7 || 21.3

College

|-
| style="text-align:left;"| 2010–11
| style="text-align:left;" rowspan=4| Florida
| 37 || 1 || 17.1 || .348 || .283 || .600 || 1.5 || 1.6 || 1.0 || .0 || 2.4
|-
| style="text-align:left;"| 2011–12
| 37 || 1 || 15.2 || .434 || .457 || .714 || 1.5 || 1.6 || .6 || .1 || 2.6
|-
| style="text-align:left;"| 2012–13
| 35 || 29 || 31.9 || .453 || .359 || .725 || 2.9 || 5.0 || 1.5 || .1 || 9.1
|-
| style="text-align:left;"| 2013–14
| 34 || 33 || 33.8 || .402 || .390 || .725 || 2.4 || 3.6 || 1.6 || .0 || 13.1
|-
| style="text-align:center;" colspan="2" | Career
| 143 || 65 || 24.2 || .416 || .376 || .711 || 2.0 || 2.9 || 1.1 || .1 || 6.6

Source: RealGM

References

External links
 
 Scottie Wilbekin at EuroLeague
 Scottie Wilbekin at Sports-Reference.com College Basketball
 
 Scottie Wilbekin at TBLStat.net
 

1993 births
Living people
21st-century African-American sportspeople
AEK B.C. players
African-American basketball players
All-American college men's basketball players
American expatriate basketball people in Australia
American expatriate basketball people in Greece
American expatriate basketball people in Israel
American expatriate basketball people in Turkey
American men's basketball players
Basketball players from Gainesville, Florida
Cairns Taipans players
Darüşşafaka Basketbol players
Fenerbahçe men's basketball players
Florida Gators men's basketball players
Maccabi Tel Aviv B.C. players
Naturalized citizens of Turkey
Point guards
Shooting guards
Turkish men's basketball players
Turkish people of African-American descent